Mbugwe or Mbuwe (Kimbugwe) is a Bantu language of spoken by the Mbugwe people of Lake Manyara in the Manyara Region of Central Tanzania. Mbugwe is estimated to be spoken by some 34,000 people.

Mbugwe is isolated from other Bantu languages, being bordered by the locally dominant Cushitic language Iraqw to the west, the Gorowa language (or dialect of Iraqw) to the south, the Nilotic Maasai language to the east, and the lake to the north. It shares about 70% vocabulary with its Bantu cousin Rangi.

Grammar 
As is common across Bantu languages, Mbugwe employs a system of noun classes. There are 16 noun classes. The subclasses 1a and 15a are also identified.

The syntax is head-initial with adjectives and other modifiers appearing after the noun. Demonstratives may sometimes appear before the head noun.

Phonology 
Mbugwe is considered to be a seven-vowel language. It is a tonal language with two levels of tone identified - High and Low. Tone is distinctive lexically as well as grammatically.

Genetic affiliation 
The language most closely related to Mbugwe is Rangi spoke in the Kondoa District of Central Tanzania. Mbugwe has been classified as F.34 following Guthrie's Bantu classification.

References

Languages of Tanzania
Mbugwe-Rangi languages